A maul may refer to any number of large hammers, including:

 War hammer, a medieval weapon
 Post maul, a type of sledgehammer
 Spike maul, railroad hand tool
 Splitting maul, heavy wood-splitting tool resembling both axe and hammer

People
 Al Maul (1865-1958), an American baseball player
 Günther Maul (1909-1997), German ichthyologist 
 John Maul (1857–1931), English clergyman and cricketer

Other uses 
 Darth Maul, Star Wars character
 MAUL, a semi-automatic shotgun
 Maul, a rugby term
 Maul, 2003 novel by Tricia Sullivan

See also
 Maull, a surname
 Mauler (disambiguation)
 Maule (disambiguation)

Surnames from nicknames